Trade Republic Bank GmbH is a German online broker in Berlin. Shares, derivatives and cryptocurrencies can be traded on a mobile app.

History 
Trade Republic was founded in Munich in 2015 under the name Neon Trading in the startup incubator of Comdirect Bank. The company's founders are philosopher Christian Hecker, physicist Thomas Pischke and computer scientist Marco Cancellieri.
In 2017, Düsseldorf-based Sino AG invested in the startup and acquired the majority of the company's shares.
In 2019 and 2020, venture capitalists Creandum, Project A Ventures, Accel Partners and Founders Fund invested over 60 million euros in Trade Republic; Sino sold shares and was henceforth no longer the majority owner.

Securities trading via app was offered in Germany for a closed user group starting in February 2019 and without user restrictions starting in May 2019. As of April 2020, Trade Republic had 150,000 users. More than one-third of customers had "never bought a stock or invested in an ETF before," according to Trade Republic. Users were "on average in their mid-30s" and "male." Trade Republic began offering its services in Austria in November 2020, as well as in France and Spain in 2021. By the end of 2020, the company reportedly had 600,000 customers with four billion euros in assets under management. Eighty percent of users would have set up an equity or ETF savings plan.

As part of GameStop's 2021 stock surge, Trade Republic imposed a stop-buy on select stocks, including GameStop's stock, on the afternoon of January 28, 2021. The broker cited the "extreme situation in the market" and investor protection as reasons for the decision. Over 4,000 complaints were later filed at Federal Financial Supervisory Authority over this decision.

In May 2021, another financing round of $900 million was announced at a valuation of $5 billion. In June 2022 Trade Republic raised another 250 million 

In June 2022, Trade Republic proceed with layoffs due to an overgrowth of their work force and tightening business conditions.

References 

2015 establishments in Germany
German companies established in 2015
Companies based in Berlin
Financial services companies established in 2015
Online brokerages
Online financial services companies of Germany